Aecidium is a genus of rust fungi in the order Pucciniales. The widespread genus is estimated to contain about 600 species.

Existence and occurrences 

There have been 11737 occurrences of Aecidium. Though the genus can be found globally, it has been predominantly found in the USA and Europe.

Species 

 Aecidium abietis-mariesii
 Aecidium abscedens
 Aecidium acalyphae
 Aecidium acalyphae-ciliatae
 Aecidium acanthocarpi
 Aecidium acanthopanacis
 Aecidium aceris
 Aecidium achyrophori
 Aecidium aconiti-anthorae
 Aecidium aconiti-paniculati
 Aecidium aconiti-phragmitincolae
 Aecidium actinidiae
 Aecidium adenariae
 Aecidium adenophorae
 Aecidium adenophorae-verticillatae
 Aecidium adenostylis
 Aecidium adhatodae
 Aecidium adhatodicola
 Aecidium advectitium
 Aecidium aechmantherae
 Aecidium ageratinae
 Aecidium agnesiae
 Aecidium aikeni
 Aecidium alanthi
 Aecidium ajugae
 Aecidium akebiae
 Aecidium alangii
 Aecidium alaskanum
 Aecidium alaterni
 Aecidium albicans
 Aecidium albiceratum
 Aecidium alchorneae
 Aecidium alchorneae-rugosae
 Aecidium alibertiae
 Aecidium allii-ursini
 Aecidium alternantherae
 Aecidium amagense
 Aecidium amaryllidis
 Aecidium amazonense
 Aecidium ampliatum
 Aecidium anaphalidis-leptophyllae
 Aecidium anceps
 Aecidium ancundense
 Aecidium ancylanthi
 Aecidium andicola
 Aecidium anemarrhenae
 Aecidium anemones-silvestris
 Aecidium anningense
 Aecidium annonae
 Aecidium anograe
 Aecidium antherici
 Aecidium anthericicola
 Aecidium antholyzae
 Aecidium aphelandrae
 Aecidium aposeridis
 Aecidium approximans
 Aecidium araliae
 Aecidium archibaccharidis
 Aecidium arctoum
 Aecidium arcularium
 Aecidium arenariae
 Aecidium argyreiae-involucratae
 Aecidium argythamniae
 Aecidium ari
 Aecidium aridum
 Aecidium aristochiicola
 Aecidium artabotrydis
 Aecidium arunci
 Aecidium asarifolium
 Aecidium asparagacearum
 Aecidium asperulae-ciliatae
 Aecidium asphodeli
 Aecidium asphodeli-microcarpi
 Aecidium aspiliae
 Aecidium astrochlaenae
 Aecidium atriplicis
 Aecidium atroalbum
 Aecidium atrocrustaceum
 Aecidium avocense
 Aecidium baccharidis
 Aecidium baccharidophilum
 Aecidium baileyanum
 Aecidium balearicum
 Aecidium banaticum
 Aecidium banketense
 Aecidium banosense
 Aecidium barbareae
Note: This list is incomplete. The full list can be seen here.

References

External links 

Fungal plant pathogens and diseases
Pucciniales